German submarine U-1274 was a Type VIIC/41 U-boat built for Nazi Germany's Kriegsmarine for service during World War II.
She was ordered on 13 June 1942, and was laid down on 21 June 1943 by Vegesacker Werft AG, Bremen as yard number 69, launched on 25 January 1944 and commissioned on 1 March 1944 under Oberleutnant zur See Fedor Kuscher.

Design
German Type VIIC/41 submarines were preceded by the heavier Type VIIC submarines. U-1274 had a displacement of  when at the surface and  while submerged. She had two shafts and two  propellers.

U-1274 was fitted with five  torpedo tubes (four fitted at the bow and one at the stern), fourteen torpedoes, one  SK C/35 naval gun, (220 rounds), one  Flak M42 and two  C/30 anti-aircraft guns. The boat had a complement of between forty-four and sixty.

Service history
The boat's service career began on 1 March 1944 with the 8th Training Flotilla, followed by active service with 5th Flotilla on 1 March 1945. U-1274 took part in no wolfpacks.

Summary of raiding history

See also
 Battle of the Atlantic

References

Bibliography

German Type VIIC/41 submarines
U-boats commissioned in 1944
World War II submarines of Germany
1944 ships
World War II shipwrecks in the North Sea
Ships built in Bremen (state)
U-boats sunk by British warships
U-boats sunk by depth charges
Ships lost with all hands
Maritime incidents in April 1945